Shabkhus Lat (also Romanized as Shabkhūs Lāt) is a village in Tutaki Rural District, in the Central District of Siahkal County, Gilan Province, Iran. At the 2006 census, its population was 45, in 13 families.

References 

Populated places in Siahkal County